Permutatude theory is an ongoing conceptual framework for exploring mass collective psychology and global social evolution as developed by interdisciplinary artist and theorist, Gayil Nalls. Permutatude identifies information and communication technologies (ICTs) as a medium for exponentially expanding human massing events and their meaning, and as a forum for collective actions, increasing the potential for rapid change to social systems.

Theory
Formulated in the mid-1980s, permutatude theory hypothesizes that massing events have the potential to become as expansive as the technology of a particular historical moment allows. People having similar values, beliefs, and needs around the world could bond mentally and emotionally with the collective actions of real crowds, rapidly growing the size of the massing event and forming new dynamics of power. These changes, creating an exponential structure of massing events occur according to the proportion of ICTs per capita, per country, or culture. The theory is based on Nalls' remote observations of crowds, the study of crowd theory, and her artistic practice of creating works that foment chemical bonding in crowds. Nalls has found that humans have innate mechanisms that are activated in situations of threat and feel relief in groups of like-minded, capable of mediating the threat.

Permutatude theory posits that crowds are composed of participants who bond with each other through the senses, particularly through physiological chemosensory mechanisms via the sense of smell. Based partly on this bonding, crowds themselves take on characteristics, often revealed through particular shapes and patterns, and the specific way they move or flow. Images of crowds, their patterns, and their participants are transmitted through ICTs and are recognized by viewers, who in turn may respond empathetically, though not necessarily consciously, to both the crowd as a whole and to individuals in the crowd. Nalls has hypothesized that this expansive bonding through image technology is potentially explained by mirror neurons, which manage empathy responses between individuals, however, less is known about empathetic responses to crowds.

According to permutatude theory, permutations in attitudes, values, and beliefs can now rapidly evolve on a global scale in relationship to the proportion of ICTs. Permutatude thus explains one part of a natural but complex biological evolutionary process toward globalization as a survival mechanism. The explorations look at how the brain translates the physical stimulus of crowds or images of crowds that occurs in chemosensory, somatosensory, auditory, and visual systems.

Etymology
Permutatude is a portmanteau of permute and attitude, though it also calls to mind other words such as mute (as in being silent) and mutation (as in an act or modification in form and/or structure). The first published definition for permutatude occurs in the 1992 catalogue from Nalls' solo exhibition, Permutatude, at Phillippe Staib Gallery in New York City:
	
A world capable of being changed; a transformation or rapid evolution of attitude of individuals on a large scale allowing a reordering to take place; revolt by the once silent masses against constituted authority; majority will; a sudden necessary modification in the global community ‘permitting’ rapid change to take place; exercise of authority by the masses, the natural instincts of democracy.

The text below presages later scientific studies and insights into the biological and neurological bases of human empathy.

Permutatude is a stage of humankind’s global functional adaptation. This giant step in human development is taking place in as many varied ways, with as many permutations as there are countries, cultures and people. Nothing less than the whole juvenile human condition is in transformation. Image technologies are mirroring the multitudes, creating intellectual and biological sympathy, anticipating a new world community, burying old political orders and creating new ones. Our technology, intentionally and unintentionally, consciously and unconsciously, has speeded up an evolutionary process. We transmit and bond with ritual action globally. We are doing this instinctively. Individuals clustering by like-mindedness, united in strategy to meet basic human needs are shifting the scope of concern to a global context by their images, our images, on the airwaves. In the anatomy of moving masses we are individuals in search of a world community. The meaning for this change is buried within each of us.

The idea of permutatude began with the Revolutions of 1989, when people around the world watched in real time as millions flooded the streets of Poland, Hungary, East Germany, Czechoslovakia, Bulgaria and Romania and witnessed the events surrounding the fall of communism in those countries. Similar events also informed the theory: the Tiananmen Square protests, where millions more gathered; the German reunification in 1990,  dissolution of the Soviet Union in 1991, and the global protests at the beginning of the First Gulf War as well as the “Operation: Welcome Home” celebrations, and counter-protests, in New York City at the war’s end. 

As the democratic yearning described in Permutaude continued to unfold, the Arab Spring upheavals spread, driven by social media, despite the distinct political and cultural history of each country. The movement first emerged under the name The Jasmine Revolution, a term which Nalls suggests pays homage to the cohesion of the revolutionaries and their felt group chemistry. Nalls' research has found that there are intrinsic links between geographic locations, environmental smells, and human behaviour around the world.

Related works
The film, Permutatude Study/Permutatude Text, documents two massing events, the fall of the Berlin Wall in 1989, and Operation Welcome Home event in New York City at the end of the first Gulf War. The video combines Permutatude Text, a dynamic visual of Permutatude writings with massing footage. The works were first exhibited at the Phillippe Staib Gallery in New York in 1992 as separate visuals in one installation, however, they were later combined into one projection.

In 1999, Nalls' exhibited 1,495,852,024 at Steffany Martz Gallery, New York, NY. The installation featured a series of triptychs, named after those countries that identified a species of jasmine as their most culturally relevant scent in Nalls' World Sensorium research.  Each triptych included a selected large-scale photojournalistic image of a crowd; a photographic image of jasmine shrubs taken by the artist, and an engraved bottle containing a jasmine oil composition. The images of crowds were researched for their unique qualities in showing large-visual-field human portraiture and the different socio-dynamics of massing events.

In the 2012 exhibition, The Smell of a Critical Moment, a work involving the participation of Occupy Wall Street protestors, she continued her explorations of the multimodal communication systems involved in the underlying chemosensory information exchanged in crowds and then through an immersive installation.

References

Crowd psychology